Orlando Otto Kaesemodel Neto, better known as Lico Kaesemodel (born May 10, 1983 in Curitiba) is a Brazilian racing driver, currently drives in Stock Car Brasil.

Career
He started karting career in 1995 and won four time the Curitiba states championship, three time South Brazilian championship and one time the Brazilian championship.

He won the Trofeo Maserati Brazil in 2004. Kaesemodel debuted to Stock Car Brasil in 2006 for one race to Katalogo Racing team. In 2007 will move to AMG Motorsport as a teammate of Ingo Hoffmann. In 2010 Kaesemodel will move from AMG Motorsport to RCM Motorsport.

Complete Stock Car Brasil results

External links
 
 

1983 births
Living people
Brazilian people of German descent
Stock Car Brasil drivers
Brazilian racing drivers
Sportspeople from Curitiba